Epidauria cantonella is a species of snout moth in the genus Epidauria. It was described by Shibuya in 1931, and is known from China.

References

Moths described in 1931
Anerastiini